Changer(s) may refer to:
 Changer (band), an Icelandic death metal/metalcore band
 Changer, a 1998 novel by Jane Lindskold
 "Changer" (song), by Maître Gims
 Changer of Worlds, a 2001 story anthology
 Changer les Choses, a 2001 album by Nâdiya
 Money changer, a person or organization that exchanges coins or currency
 Changers (Wildstorm), a comic book superhero team
 Changers, a fictional race in the Culture series

See also 
 Change (disambiguation)